According to Parkswatch  and the IUCN, Guatemala is considered the fifth biodiversity hotspot in the world. The country has 14 ecoregions ranging from mangrove forest (4 species), in both ocean littorals, dry forests and scrublands in the eastern highlands, subtropical and tropical rain forests, wetlands, cloud forests in the Verapaz region, mixed forests and pine forests in the highlands.

Over one third of Guatemala (36.3% or about 39,380 km²) is forested (2005). About half of the forests (49.7% or roughly 19,570 km²) is classified as primary forest which is considered the most biodiverse forest type. Tree species include 17 conifers (pines, cypress, including the endemic Abies guatemalensis), the most in any tropical region of the world.

Guatemala has 7 wetlands of international importance that were included in the Ramsar List.

Guatemala has some 1246 known species of amphibians, birds, mammals and reptiles according to figures from the World Conservation Monitoring Centre. Of these, 6.7% are endemic, meaning they exist in no other country, and 8.1% are threatened species. It is also home to at least 8681 species of vascular plants, of which 13.5% are endemic. 5.4% of the country is protected under IUCN categories I-V.

With a total of 123 protected areas and more than 29% of the territory declared a protected area, Guatemala has the largest percentage of protected areas in Central America. Tikal National Park, which was created in 1955, was the first mixed UNESCO World Heritage Site in the world.

References

External links
CEP Technical Report No. 36 1996: Status of Protected Area Systems in the Wider Caribbean Region - Country Profiles: GUATEMALA 

Natural history of Guatemala
Nature conservation in Guatemala
Ramsar sites in Guatemala